Daisy Edith Kessler Biermann (August 24, 1874 - September 21, 1963) was a magazine and newspaper writer, a painter, and a pianist.

Early life
Daisy Edith Kessler was born in Cleveland, Ohio, August 24, 1874, the daughter of Philip L. Kessler and Sarah Hall.

Career
For twenty-five years Daisy Kessler Biermann was the editor of the Women's Section and music and art critic of the San Diego Union.

She was actively identified with art and musical development of the city.

She was the author of a large number of published short stories and magazine articles.

She was a member of: American Pen Women (San Diego Branch), San Diego Fine Arts Society, Art Guild, Wednesday Club, San Diego Woman's Press Club, Amphion Club.

Personal life
Daisy Kessler moved to California in 1898 with her family and lived at El Cajon, California. The J. P. R. Hall and Phil Kessler families ran the Hall & Kessler lumberyard.

In 1913 Daisy Kessler married her colleague at The Sacramento Union Francis Xavier Joseph Biermann, a political reporter.

Biermann died on September 21, 1963.

References

1874 births
1963 deaths
20th-century American painters
20th-century American women artists
20th-century American women writers
20th-century American non-fiction writers
American women journalists
People from Cleveland